The Roßberg is a hill in Hesse, Germany.

References 

Mountains of Hesse